The following is a list of notable people associated with Washburn University, located in Topeka, Kansas, United States.

Arts and entertainment

 Bill Kurtis (J.D. '66; D.Lit. '85) television journalist and producer
 Kerry Livgren, primary songwriter and founding member of progressive rock band Kansas
 Larry Niven (B.A. '62; D.Lit. '84) science-fiction writer
 James Reynolds ('69) actor; portrays Capt. Abe Carver on the soap opera Days of Our Lives
 Bradbury Thompson (1911–1995) (B.A. '34; D.F.A. 65) graphic artist

Business

 Greg Brenneman (B.B.A. '84; DComm '99) chief executive officer, Quiznos; former chief executive officer, Burger King; former chief operating officer, Continental Airlines
 Rich Davis (1926-2015) founder, Kansas City Masterpiece; former dean, University of North Dakota School of Medicine and Health Sciences
 John F. Kilmartin Jr. (1921-2004) former chairman and chief executive officer, Mervyns
 Ronald K. Richey (1926-2010) president and chief executive officer (1985–1998), Torchmark Corporation

Government and politics

 Henry Justin Allen (1868–1950) 21st Governor of Kansas
 Georgia Neese Clark Gray (1900–1995; B.A. '21; D.B.A. '66) 29th (and first female) Treasurer of the United States
 Don O. Concannon ('52) Chairman of the Kansas Republican Party from 1968 to 1970. Unsuccessful candidate for Governor in 1974
 Bob Dole (J.D. '52; LLD '69) former U.S. Senator from Kansas and Senate Majority Leader, Republican candidate for President of the United States (1996)
 John Edward Erickson (1863–1946; 1890) Governor of Montana and U.S. Senator
 Joan Finney (1925–2001; B.A. '82; D.P.S. '95) 42nd Governor of Kansas (1991–95; the state's first female governor); Kansas State Treasurer (1972–1986)
 Arthur Fletcher (1924–2005; B.A. '50; D.H.L. '90)chairman, National Black Chamber of Commerce; director, U.S. Commission on Civil Rights; executive director, United Negro College Fund
 Denver David Hargis U.S. Representative from Kansas
 John F. Hayes Kansas State Representative
 Donald R. Heath U.S. Ambassador to Cambodia (1952), Vietnam (1952–1955), Lebanon (1955–1957) and Saudi Arabia (1958–1961)
 Harold S. Herd Kansas State Senator (1965–1972), Senate Minority Leader; Mayor of Coldwater, Kansas (1950–1954)
 Delano Lewis (J.D. '63; LLD '00) former U.S. Ambassador to South Africa; former president, National Public Radio
 Charles D. McAtee Director of Kansas penal institutions during the last executions held in Kansas; candidate for Congress and attorney general (Republican)
 John McCuish ('25) 34th Governor of Kansas
 Dennis Moore (J.D. '70) U.S. Representative from Overland Park
 Paul J. Morrison Kansas Attorney General (2007–2008), District Attorney of Johnson County, Kansas (1990–2007)
 Howard B. Myers, (Ph.D.) Director, Division of Social Research, Works Progress Administration during FDR's New Deal
 Roger Noriega (B.A. '82) Assistant Secretary of State for Western Hemisphere Affairs, United States Department of State
 Mike Padilla Mayor of Topeka, Kansas (2022–present)
 Warren W. Shaw Kansas State Representative (1951–1957); candidate for Governor of Kansas (1956); member of the Washburn Athletic Hall of Fame
 Jim Slattery Kansas State Representative (1973–1979); U.S. Representative from Kansas's 2nd congressional district (1983–1995); candidate for Governor of Kansas (1994), candidate for the U.S. Senate (2008)
 Robert T. Stephan – Attorney General of Kansas (1979–1995)
 Robert Stone Speaker of the Kansas House of Representatives (1915), Kansas State Representative (1905–1917)
 Ron Thornburgh Kansas Secretary of State (1995–2010)
 Togiola Tulafono (J.D. 1975) Governor of American Samoa (2003–2013)
 Douglas S. Wright Mayor of Topeka, Kansas (1983–1989)

Journalism
 Arthur J. Carruth Jr. (1887–1962) co-owner and editor, Topeka State Journal; chairman, Washburn Board of Regents; namesake of the university's Carruth Hall
 Reuben H. Markham (1887–1949) (B.A. 1908) missionary educator in Bulgaria; journalist for the Christian Science Monitor, author of numerous books

Law

 Sam A. Crow (1926–2022) Senior Judge, United States District Court for the District of Kansas (1981–present)
 Lee A. Johnson (b. 1947) (J.D. '80) Kansas Supreme Court Justice (2005–present)
 Tyler C. Lockett (1932–2020)  Kansas Supreme Court (1983–2002); District court judge in Wichita (1977–1983); Judge, common pleas court (1971–1977)
 Marla Luckert (b. 1955) (J.D. '80) Kansas Supreme Court Justice (2003–present)
 J. Thomas Marten (b. 1951) District Judge, United States District Court for the District of Kansas (1996–present)
 Kay McFarland (1935–2015) (B.A. '57; J.D. '64) first female chief justice of the Kansas Supreme Court
 Eric F. Melgren (b. 1956) District Judge, United States District Court for the District of Kansas (2008–present)
 Loren Miller (1903–1967) Municipal Court Judge, County of Los Angeles, California (1964-1967)
 Nancy Moritz (J.D. '85) Kansas Supreme Court Justice (2011–2014); Judge for 10th Circuit Court of Appeals (2014–present)
 Joseph Wilson Morris senior partner, Gable & Gotwals (1984–present); general counsel of Shell Oil (1978–1983); Chief Judge, Eastern District of Oklahoma (1974–1978); Dean, University of Tulsa College of Law (1972–1974)
 Paul J. Morrison (B.A.; J.D.) former Attorney General for the State of Kansas
 Fred Phelps (B.A. '62; J.D. '64) disbarred lawyer and pastor of the Westboro Baptist Church, known for its extreme views on homosexuality, Christianity, and American soldiers; he and the Westboro Baptist Church were the subject of a U.S. Supreme Court case, Snyder v. Phelps
 Shirley Phelps-Roper (B.A. '79; J.D. '81) daughter of Fred Phelps; attorney and spokesperson for the Westboro Baptist Church
 Eric Rosen (J.D. '84) Kansas Supreme Court Justice (2007–present)
 Gordon Sloan (1911–2006) (J.D. '35) former judge on the Oregon Supreme Court
 Robert Stone (1866–1957) (B.A. 1889) founder of Washburn Law School in 1903, Speaker of the Kansas House of Representatives (1915)
 Ozell Miller Trask (1909–1984) appointed by President Richard Nixon as a Federal Judge, U.S. Court of Appeals, Ninth Circuit (1969–1984)

Science and technology

 Karl Bowman (1888–1973) former chief of psychiatry at Bellevue Hospital in New York; former director of the Langley Porter Psychiatric Clinic at the University of California, San Francisco (1954–1964), Superintendent of the Alaska Psychiatric Institute (1964–1967)
 Lauren Drain nurse and author known for writing the 2013 book Banished, which chronicles her experiences and eventual banishment from the controversial Westboro Baptist Church
 Karl Menninger (1893–1990) psychiatrist; co-founder, the Menninger Clinic
 Earl Wilbur Sutherland Jr. (1915–1974) (B.S. '37) recipient, 1971 Nobel Prize in Physiology or Medicine
 Robert Whittaker (1920–1980) (B.S. '42) plant ecologist; known for first proposing the five kingdom taxonomic classification and Whittaker Biome Classification.

Military service

 Brigadier General Arthur S. Champeny (1893–1979) only man in U.S. history to receive the Distinguished Service Cross in three separate conflicts: World War I, World War II and Korea
 Rear Admiral Stanley Thomas Counts (1926–2015) commanded  and  during the Vietnam War
 Brigadier General Clarence T. "Curly" Edwinson (1912–1985) flew 30 missions as a World War II fighter pilot; Commander, 42nd Air Division, U.S. Air Force; all conference halfback at Washburn
 Major General Kathleen E. Fick Director of Intelligence of the National Guard Bureau
 Brigadier General Howard S. Searle (1891–1972) Assistant Division Commander, 35th Infantry Division
 Colonel Leroy W. Stutz (b. 1939) U.S. Air Force pilot; shot down on his 85th mission in Vietnam; spent 2,284 days as a prisoner of war, including time at the "Hanoi Hilton" (attended WU in 1960, transferred to Air Force Academy)

Sports
See also List of Washburn Ichabods head football coaches

 Ernest Bearg (1893-1971) WU football coach (1918–19, 1929–35), Nebraska coach (1925–28), Nebraska football Hall of Fame (1988), Washburn Athletics Hall of Fame (1973–74)
 Kurt Budke (1961-2011) WU basketball and graduate assistant, head coach for Louisiana Tech (2002–2005) and Oklahoma State (2005–2011) women's programs
 Bob Davis (b. 1945) radio broadcaster for Kansas City Royals and Jayhawks football and men's basketball teams
 Morley Fraser (1922-2004) coach, Albion College (1954–1968), led school to 11 Michigan Intercollegiate Athletic Association championships
 Jim Holtgrieve (b. 1947) golfer, three-time Walker Cup champion
 Davey Lopes (b. 1945) (B.Ed '69) former manager, Milwaukee Brewers baseball team; 16-year Major League Baseball career
 Ron McHenry (b. 1962) (1984) – current women's basketball coach at Washburn
 Mike Racy (B.B.A. '87) – former NCAA vice president (1993–2013); 5th commissioner of Mid-America Intercollegiate Athletics Association
 Jerry Schemmel (b. 1959) (B.A. '82, J.D. '85) radio voice of NBA's Denver Nuggets
 Troy Stedman (b. 1965) – linebacker for Kansas City Chiefs
 Dave Wiemers (b. 1968) – college football coach
 Cary Williams (b. 1984) ('08)  NFL cornerback, Tennessee Titans (2008–2009), Baltimore Ravens (2009–2012), Philadelphia Eagles (2013–14), Seattle Seahawks (2014–present)
 Gary Woodland (b. 1984) — professional golfer on the PGA Tour, 2019 U.S. Open champion

 Corey Ballentine (b. 1996) - NFL cornerback and return specialist for the New York Giants

See also

 List of people from Topeka, Kansas

References

Washburn University alumni